Mincher is a surname. Notable people with the surname include:

Don Mincher (1938–2012), American baseball player and executive
Ed Mincher (1851–1918), American baseball player
Keith Mincher, English football manager and sports psychologist